Yevgeni Viktorovich Gerasimov (born 27 March 1968 in Legnica) is a Russian football coach and a former player.

References

1968 births
People from Legnica
Living people
Soviet footballers
FC Zenit Saint Petersburg players
FC Dynamo Saint Petersburg players
Russian footballers
FC Tekstilshchik Kamyshin players
Russian Premier League players
FC Fakel Voronezh players
FC Metallurg Lipetsk players
FC Petrotrest players
Russian football managers
Association football defenders
FC Zenit-2 Saint Petersburg players